Bethel Baptist Chapel is a Baptist chapel in the town of Llanelli, Carmarthenshire, Wales. It was built in 1840 and is located on Copperworks Road. It had a larger seating capacity than most Llanelli chapels and in 1905 could seat 850 persons.

The chapel
Bethel Baptist Chapel was the first of a series of Baptist churches erected in Llanelli in the mid nineteenth century. This was a time when Llanelli became a significant regional producer of tinplate and steel and the population was growing strongly. The chapel has a large stuccoed temple-like facade with giant pilasters and a porch with columns and a balustrade. The windows had Florentine tracery. The pulpit was very ornate and had a pedimented back, and the gallery fronts were clad in cast iron panels. The chapel has a larger seating capacity compared to other Llanelli chapels, being able to seat 850 persons in 1905, and the Sunday School was also large, catering for 300 children. A house for the caretaker adjoins the chapel.

The listing includes the adjoining former schoolroom, and the iron railings and two pairs of gates that face onto the street. The Royal Commission on the Ancient and Historical Monuments of Wales curates the archaeological, architectural and historic records for this chapel. These include a number of digital photographs and three Chapels Photographic Societies Collections.

References

Llanelli, Bethel
Churches in Llanelli
Churches completed in 1840
Llanelli, Bethel
Baptist churches in Wales